Kristine, a variant of Christine, may refer to: 
 Kristine (given name) 
 Lisa Kristine (born 1965), American photographer 
 Liv Kristine (born 1976), Norwegian singer, songwriter
 Kristine (TV series), a 2010 Filipino television series 
 Kristine Church (disambiguation), two churches in Sweden

See also
Kristin (name)
Kristen (disambiguation)
Christine (name)
Christina (disambiguation)
Cristina (disambiguation)
Kristinestad